Alexandru Mihăiță Chipciu (born 18 May 1989) is a Romanian professional footballer who plays for Liga I club Universitatea Cluj, which he captains. A versatile player, he is mainly deployed as a winger or an attacking midfielder, but has also been used as a false 9 or a wing-back on occasion.

After starting his senior career with FC Brașov, Chipciu moved to Steaua București in the winter of 2011 and won seven domestic trophies during his spell in the capital. In 2016, he transferred abroad for the first time to join Anderlecht; he helped to a national title in his first season in Belgium, but later fell out of favor and was sent on loan to Sparta Prague. At the start of 2020, Chipciu returned to his native country with defending champions CFR Cluj.

Chipciu is a Romanian international and has played for the country's under-17 and under-19 teams before making his senior debut in 2011. He was a member of the squad that participated at the UEFA Euro 2016.

Club career

Early career
Chipciu started his career at hometown club Dacia Unirea Brăila in 2001, aged 13. From 2004 to 2006, he played youth football for Sporting Pitești.

FC Brașov
At the age of 18, Chipciu made his senior squad breakthrough at FC Brașov, scoring four goals in his first year with the club. However, he received less playing time as the team aimed promotion to the first division. For the first half of the 2008–09 campaign he was loaned out to Liga II side Forex Brașov, and in the second part he rejoined his former youth club Brăila in Liga III to accumulate more experience.

Upon his return to FC Brașov, now promoted to the Liga I, Chipciu again got few opportunities to play constantly. He however had appreciated performances in the 2010–11 season, being one of the best players of the team and attracting the attention of Bucharest rivals Steaua and Dinamo. He eventually chose to stay at Brașov, signing a new contract that would have kept him at the club until 2015. Chipciu had a great start to the 2011–12 season, scoring two important goals in the opening three games.

Steaua București

On 21 December 2011, Steaua București announced that they reached an agreement with FC Brașov for the transfer of Chipciu. He penned a five-year contract, while press reported the transfer fee to be an initial €1.2 million plus 25% interest from a future sale.

Chipciu netted his first goal for the club in a 1–1 away draw at Pandurii Târgu Jiu on 31 March 2012, and his second came just one week later against Sportul Studențesc after an impressive build-up play (4–1 win, at Stadionul Steaua). On 7 May, he was sent off after receiving a red card in a match against Concordia Chiajna. During late 2012, Chipciu aided Steaua in qualifying from the UEFA Europa League group stage, where they played against VfB Stuttgart, Molde and Copenhagen. The following year, Steaua defeated Dutch club Ajax on penalty shoot-outs in the round of 32, before losing the next round to Chelsea after 3–2 on aggregate.

On 10 May 2013, in one of the last league fixtures of the season, Chipciu suffered an injury in a derby with Dinamo București and was subsequently sidelined for five months with a fractured tibia. Two weeks later, he received a winners medal after Steaua's Liga I conquest, being his first major honour. He earned six more trophies during his next three years with the Roș-albaștrii—two more league championships, one Cupa României, one Supercupa României and two Cupa Ligii.

Anderlecht
On 18 July 2016, Chipciu traveled to Belgium to undergo a medical at Anderlecht. One day later, the club officially announced the signing of a four-year contract. Anderlecht paid €3 million for the transfer, with bonus clauses potentially rising the fee to €3.5 million. 

On 7 August 2016, Chipciu scored his first goal in a 5–1 Belgian Pro League defeat of Kortrijk. After falling down the pecking order, Chipciu was sent on loan to Sparta Prague on 3 July 2018. During his one-year stint, he made 27 Czech First League appearances and netted once.

CFR Cluj
Chipciu returned to his native country on 18 January 2020, after agreeing to sign for CFR Cluj as a free agent. He played nine games without scoring in the remainder of the season, as CFR won its third-consecutive national title.

Universitatea Cluj
On 25 June 2022, Chipciu joined CFR's city rivals Universitatea Cluj on a one-year deal.

International career

On 29 March 2006, Chipciu made his debut for Romania under-17 in a match with Serbia. He also represented the country at under-19 level. Chipciu gained his first cap for the full side in 2011, playing as a starter against San Marino. On 15 November that year, he scored his first senior international goal in a friendly match in Austria with Greece. On 17 May 2016, Chipciu was picked by manager Anghel Iordănescu for his preliminary 28-man UEFA Euro 2016 squad and eventually made it to the final list.

Career statistics

Club

International

Scores and results list Romania's goal tally first, score column indicates score after each Chipciu goal.

Honours
FC Brașov
Liga II: 2007–08

Steaua București
Liga I: 2012–13, 2013–14, 2014–15
Cupa României: 2014–15
Supercupa României: 2013
Cupa Ligii: 2014–15, 2015–16

Anderlecht
Belgian First Division A: 2016–17
Belgian Super Cup: 2017

CFR Cluj
Liga I: 2019–20, 2020–21, 2021–22
Supercupa României: 2020

References

External links

1989 births
Living people
Romanian footballers
Sportspeople from Brăila
Association football midfielders
Association football forwards
Liga I players
Liga II players
AFC Dacia Unirea Brăila players
FC Brașov (1936) players
FC Steaua București players
Belgian Pro League players
R.S.C. Anderlecht players
Czech First League players
AC Sparta Prague players
CFR Cluj players
FC Universitatea Cluj players
Romania youth international footballers
Romania international footballers
UEFA Euro 2016 players
Romanian expatriate footballers
Expatriate footballers in Belgium
Romanian expatriate sportspeople in Belgium
Expatriate footballers in the Czech Republic
Romanian expatriate sportspeople in the Czech Republic